Minaminihon Broadcasting Co., Ltd., also known as MBC, is a Japanese radio and television station. It founded in 1953 and headquartered in Kagoshima, Japan. Minaminihon Broadcasting commences radio broadcasting in 1953.  In 1959, Minaminihon Broadcasting started television broadcasting.

Minaminihon Broadcasting is affiliated with the JNN (TV), JRN, NRN (RADIO). It is the only commercial broadcasting that provides both TV and radio services in Kagoshima prefecture.  In 2006, MBC started digital terrestrial television broadcasting.

References 

Japan News Network
Television stations in Japan
Radio in Japan
Radio stations established in 1953
Television channels and stations established in 1959
1953 establishments in Japan